is a Japanese water polo player. She was selected to the Japan women's national water polo team, for the 2020 Summer Olympics.

She participated at the 2018 Asian Games,  and 2019 FINA Women's Water Polo World League.

References

External links 

 Japan's Maiko Hashida, right, scores a goal as Kazakhstan's Anna Turova attempts to block during their women's water polo game at the 18th Asian Games in Jakarta, Indonesia
 Maiko Hashida #7 of Japan takes a shot against Giulia Emmolo #9 of Italy

2000 births
Living people
Japanese female water polo players
Water polo players at the 2020 Summer Olympics
Olympic water polo players of Japan
Asian Games bronze medalists for Japan
Asian Games medalists in water polo
Water polo players at the 2018 Asian Games
Medalists at the 2018 Asian Games
21st-century Japanese women